Cirsium arisanense is an endemic flowering plant of Taiwan within the family Asteraceae. Its common name in Chinese, the Alishan thistle, as well as its species name, refer to the Alishan Range. C. arisanense grows at an elevation of 2,300 meters, near mountain summits.

References
 

arisanense
Endemic flora of Taiwan